EMX or EmX may refer to:
 emx+gcc, a DOS extender and DOS and OS/2 programming environment
 Emerald Express (EmX), a bus rapid transit system in Lane County, Oregon
 EuroManx, a defunct airline which held ICAO airline designator EMX
 El Maitén Airport, an airport in Argentina which has IATA airport code EMX
 Electribe EMX, music production station by Korg

See also 
EMX1, a human gene
EMX2, a human gene